Joanna Linkiewicz (born 2 May 1990) is a Polish athlete specialising in the 400 metres hurdles. She placed 8th at the 2014 European Championships to take a silver medal at the competition two years later.

Linkiewicz won a bronze medal in the 4×400 m relays at the 2015 European Indoor Championships, and a silver running in the heats at the 2018 World Indoor Championships. She took 400 m hurdles gold at the 2015 Universiade adding second gold in 4×400 m relay, and won a silver medal in her individual event at the 2017 Universiade.

Competition record

Personal bests
Outdoor
400 metres – 53.72 (Szczecin 2013)
400 metres hurdles – 55.25 (Warsaw 2016)
Indoor
400 metres – 53.41 (Toruń 2018)

References

Polish female hurdlers
1990 births
Living people
Sportspeople from Wrocław
World Athletics Championships athletes for Poland
Athletes (track and field) at the 2016 Summer Olympics
Olympic athletes of Poland
European Athletics Championships medalists
Universiade medalists in athletics (track and field)
Universiade gold medalists for Poland
Universiade silver medalists for Poland
Polish Athletics Championships winners
World Athletics Indoor Championships medalists
Medalists at the 2015 Summer Universiade
Medalists at the 2017 Summer Universiade
Competitors at the 2013 Summer Universiade
Athletes (track and field) at the 2020 Summer Olympics
21st-century Polish women